Suddenly is the debut album by Korean duo male group J-Walk. Former Sechskies members, Kim Jae Duc and Jang Su Won, return as a project group with the name J-Walk. Their comeback/debut album has been diligently prepared since their breakup, May 2000. The featured song "Suddenly"  contains crossover jazz, R&B-ish songs with a pop/ballad format.

Suddenly was released on 21 March. According to Recording Industry Association of Korea, as of the end of December 2002, the album has sold a cumulative total of 119,317 copies. This album achieved great success so they won SBS Gayo Daejeon Popularity Award with former Sechs Kies member Kang Sunghun in 2002.

Track listing

References

 

2002 debut albums
J-Walk (South Korean band) albums